Troides plato, the silver birdwing, is a birdwing butterfly endemic to Timor.

Described forms are nychonia Jordan, 1908 (male), chitonia Jordan, 1908 (male), and delormei Le Moult, 1931 (female).

Taxonomy
Previously considered to be a subspecies of haliphron, plato was raised to a full species by Haugum and Low on the basis of differences in the genitalia.

Biogeographic realm
Australasian realm.

Related species 
Troides plato is a member of the Troides haliphron species group. The members of this clade are:

Troides haliphron (Boisduval, 1836)
Troides darsius (Gray, [1853])
Troides vandepolli (Snellen, 1890)
Troides criton (C. & R. Felder, 1860)
Troides riedeli (Kirsch, 1885)
Troides plato (Wallace, 1865)
Troides staudingeri (Röber, 1888)

References

Haugum, J. & Low, A.M. 1978-1985. A Monograph of the Birdwing Butterflies. 2 volumes. Scandinavian Press, Klampenborg; 663 pp.
Kurt Rumbucher and Oliver Schäffler, 2004 Part 19, Papilionidae X. Troides III. in Erich Bauer and Thomas Frankenbach Eds. Butterflies of the World. Keltern: Goecke & Evers

External links

Troides plato at Nagypal
Timor and Wetar Deciduous Forests

plato
Butterflies of Indonesia
Insects of Timor
Butterflies described in 1865
Taxa named by Alfred Russel Wallace